The Mackay Mountains are a prominent group of peaks  south of the Allegheny Mountains in the Ford Ranges of Marie Byrd Land, Antarctica. They were discovered by the Byrd Antarctic Expedition in 1934, and named for Clarence Mackay of the Postal Telegraph and Mackay Radio Companies, a benefactor of the expedition.

See also
 Mount Palombo

References

Ford Ranges